Follow the Girl is a 1917 American silent Western film directed by Louis Chaudet and starring Ruth Stonehouse, Jack Dill and Roy Stewart.

Cast
 Ruth Stonehouse as Hilda Swanson
 Jack Dill as Olaf
 Roy Stewart as Larry O'Keefe
 Mattie Witting as Mrs. O'Keefe
 Claire Du Brey as Donna
 Alfred Allen as Martinez
 Harry Dunkinson as Hong Foo

References

External links
 

1917 films
1917 Western (genre) films
American black-and-white films
Films directed by Louis Chaudet
Silent American Western (genre) films
Universal Pictures films
1910s English-language films
1910s American films